City Missions were Christian missions established in cities, as part of the City Mission movement started by David Nasmith in 1826.

City Mission may also refer to:
Glasgow City Mission
London City Mission
Melbourne City Mission